Chengizkhanpeta is a village located in the Edlapadu mandal, in the Guntur district of Andhra Pradesh, India.

Population 

It has a population of 5000  who are mostly engaged in agriculture.

References
 namaste.net.in

Villages in Guntur district